Joseph Wartnerchaney is an American director, screenwriter, and editor.

Early life
Wartnerchaney was born in Portland, Oregon, United States.

Career
Wartnerchaney is a nationally recognized film and live performance creator and director. He is known for writing and directing the motion picture Decay. Wartnerchaney has received rave reviews from Ain't It Cool News, Fangoria, and the Slaughterd Bird. His movie Decay premiered at the Denver Film Festival in 2015.

Filmography

References

External links
 

Living people
American film directors
American film editors
American male screenwriters
Writers from Portland, Oregon
Year of birth missing (living people)
Screenwriters from Oregon